The Morotai white-eye (Zosterops dehaani) is a species of bird in the family Zosteropidae. It is endemic to Morotai in the northern Moluccas. It was separated from the cream-throated white-eye based on distinct plumage, exceptional dawn song, and submontane/montane ecology

References

Morotai white-eye
Birds of the Maluku Islands
Morotai white-eye